Briskeby or Briskebyen may refer to:

 Briskeby, a band
 Briskeby, Oslo, a neighborhood of Oslo, Norway
 Briskeby Line, part of the Oslo Tramway
 Briskebyen, Oppland, a neighborhood of Gjøvik, Norway
 Briskebyen, Hedmark, a neighborhood of Hamar, Norway
 Briskeby Arena, a football stadium in Hamar, Norway
 Briskebyen FL, a former football team from Hamar, see History of Hamarkameratene